Dobra  (Dobra) is a village in the administrative district of Gmina Sieniawa, within Przeworsk County, Subcarpathian Voivodeship, in south-eastern Poland.

The village has a population of 490.

References

Dobra